The Nord 1500 Griffon was an experimental ramjet-powered interceptor aircraft designed and built by French state-owned aircraft manufacturer Nord Aviation. The Griffon was developed to become a Mach 2 follow on to the supersonic Nord Gerfaut research aircraft. Development of the aircraft began in earnest after the receipt of a letter of intent in 1953 for a pair of unarmed research aircraft. The design featured an innovative dual propulsion turbojet-ramjet configuration; the former being used to takeoff and attain sufficient speed to start the latter.

The first prototype, named Griffon I, made its maiden flight in 1955 and eventually reached a speed of Mach 1.3. Because it lacked the ramjet engine, it was mostly used for exploring the aircraft's aerodynamic properties and its systems. Its flight testing was terminated shortly after the ramjet-equipped Griffon II made its first flight two years later. This aircraft attained a maximum speed of Mach 2.19 and set a world record for a small closed course in 1959. It was last flown in 1961 and currently resides in the Musée de l'air et de l'espace outside Paris, France.

Development and description
The Nord 1500 Griffon originated from a state-sponsored study into delta and swept wings. To provide data for these studies Arsenal de l'Aéronautique (SFECMAS's nationalised predecessor) built a wooden glider, the Arsenal 1301, that could be fitted with both delta and swept wings and with and without canards. Towed to the release point by SNCAC Martinet, Douglas DC-3 or SNCASE Languedoc transport aircraft, the glider provided valuable data for the design of the Gerfaut.

To utilise this data SFECMAS's chief designer, Jean Galtier, initiated the 1400, 1500 and 1910 interceptor projects with delta wings and different types of propulsion systems. The 1400 developed into the Nord Gerfaut series, the 1500 became the Griffon, while the 1910, ambitiously specified with two large ramjet engines, was never pursued. Galtier envisioned the Griffon as the Mach 2 successor to the supersonic Gerfaut. By this time Arsenal had been privatised as SFECMAS - Société Française d'Etude et de Construction de Matériel Aéronautiques Spéciaux. Powered by a large ramjet with turbojet sustainer, the Griffon was renamed from the SFECMAS 1500 Guépard (Cheetah) after SFECMAS was merged with SNCAN to form Nord Aviation.

On 24 August 1953, a pair of prototypes were ordered, although the final contract (No. 2003/55) would not be issued until 1955. Although intended by Nord to eventually fulfil a requirement for a light interceptor capable of using grass airfields, these two aircraft were ordered without any military equipment installed, being intended for research purposes only.

Much like he did with the Gerfaut, Gaultier opted for a straight-through air duct to keep the air entering the engines as calm as possible and positioned the single-seat cockpit immediately above the semi-circular ventral air intake. The large tubular fuselage supported the same delta wing as used on the Gerfaut and the swept vertical stabilizer with rudder. The forward fuselage had small triangular canards positioned at either side of this cockpit to counteract the center of pressure of the delta wing's tendency to depress the nose as the aircraft approached transonic speeds. The aircraft was fitted with a tricycle undercarriage that retracted into the wings and the underside of the air intake.

A key innovation of the Griffon was its dual-propulsion arrangement, which incorporated a turbojet-ramjet powerplant. The turbojet would enable the aircraft to perform unassisted takeoffs (ramjets cannot produce thrust at zero airspeed, and thus cannot move an aircraft from a standstill) while the ramjet would providing additional thrust once the aircraft had attained an airspeed in excess of 1,000 km/h (600 mph). To reduce risks in using the turbo-ramjet powerplant, the first Griffon (Nord 1500-01 Griffon I) was built with only the afterburning  SNECMA Atar 101G21 turbojet engine installed with the ramjet to be added at a later date.

Flight testing

The Griffon I made its maiden flight on 20 September 1955, piloted by André Turcat. Flight testing quickly proved the aircraft to be underpowered, a determination that was compounded by the cancellation of plans to install the planned ramjet propulsion system. Despite this reported lack of power, the Griffon I still managed to attain a maximum speed of Mach 1.15 on its first supersonic flight on 11 January 1956. Although the initial flight testing showed that engine performance above  suffered, the aircraft's handling qualities were excellent. Its nose gear collapsed on 19 June when Turcat was taxiing across a grass field and the aircraft did not fly again until 26 July. The Griffon I was largely similar to the later ramjet-equipped Griffon II; amongst the few visible differences between the two aircraft were the smaller intake and the two-position exhaust nozzle used only on the Griffon I. It was retired on 16 April 1957.

The Griffon II was fitted with the combination of an Atar 101E-3 turbojet and Nord ramjet. To accommodate the  diameter of the latter, the aft fuselage was lengthened and widened and its greater requirement for air meant that the ventral air intake had to be enlarged. The aircraft made its first flight on 23 January 1957 and its first supersonic flight occurred on 6 April. Performance was disappointing as it failed to exceed the Mach 1.3 of the Griffon I as the ramjet was still not receiving enough air to fully power it. The Griffon II subsequently had the intake enlarged yet again and reached Mach 1.85 on its first test flight afterwards. It attained a peak speed of Mach 2.19 at  while being piloted by Turcat on 13 October. The United States Air Force (USAF) contributed some money for the flight testing until 1960. No flights were made at all between February and July of that year and the Griffon II made its last flight on 5 June 1961.

The flight-test program had revealed several technical difficulties were present in the aircraft, including concerns regarding kinetically-generated heat. One particular area of concern was the ramjet exhaust temperature which frequently damaged the tailpipe, another was the skin temperature of the airframe's Duralumin-alloy skin. Flight tests also focused on trying to control the ramjet, which could not be throttled up or down, just on or off, via adjusting the fuel/air ratio. Pilots reported that the Griffon II's flight characteristics were excellent at all speeds: the ramjet could be ignited across a very wide band of speeds and its air intake was insensitive to angle of attack issues. Furthermore its ability to maintain acceleration in a turn was instrumental to its success in the closed-circuit record performance.

Variants
SFECMAS 1500 Guépard
The original designation and name of the initial design studies carried out at SFECMAS.
Nord 1500-01 Griffon I
The first aircraft completed with only the SNECMA Atar 101F afterburning turbojet component of the planned turbo-ramjet powerplant.
Nord 1500-02 Griffon II
The second aircraft fitted with the definitive turbo-ramjet powerplant.

Operators

Aircraft on display

The Nord 1500 Griffon II is presently on display in the French Air and Space Museum, at Le Bourget, near Paris.

Specifications (Nord 1500-2 Griffon II)

See also

References

Citations

Bibliography
Buttler, Tony and Jean-Louis Delezenne. X-Planes of Europe: Secret Research Aircraft from the Golden Age 1946-1974. Manchester, UK: Hikoki Publications, 2010. 
Carbonel, Jean-Christophe. French Secret Projects 1: Post War Fighters. Manchester, UK: Crecy Publishing, 2016 
 El-Sayed, Ahmed F. Fundamentals of Aircraft and Rocket Propulsion. Springer, 2016. .

Further reading

External links 

 Overview of the Griffon program (in French)
 Griffon II (in French)
 Griffon derivatives (in French)
 EADS - Nord 1500
 Turbo-ramjet genesis (in French)

1950s French experimental aircraft
Ramjet-powered aircraft
Low-wing aircraft
Griffon
Canard aircraft
Aircraft first flown in 1955